Sobole may refer to the following places:
Sobole, Lublin Voivodeship (east Poland)
Sobole, Masovian Voivodeship (east-central Poland)
Sobole, Warmian-Masurian Voivodeship (north Poland)

See also
 Sobol (disambiguation)